Mount Jepson is a 13,390-foot-elevation (4,081 meter) summit located on the shared boundary of Fresno County and Inyo County in California, United States.

Description
The peak is set on the crest of the Sierra Nevada mountain range in the Palisades area. It straddles the border shared by Kings Canyon National Park and John Muir Wilderness. The John Muir Trail passes below the south base of the peak, providing an approach option.

History

The first ascent of the summit was made July 3, 1939, by Don McGeein, and Chet and Evelyn Errett.

This mountain's toponym was officially adopted in 1971 by the United States Board on Geographic Names to honor Willis Linn Jepson (1867–1946), Professor of Botany, University of California at Berkeley, conservationist, writer, and charter member of the Sierra Club. Dr. Lawrence R. Heckard, president of the California Botanical Society, submitted the name to the board for consideration for permanent official status. "Pine Marten Peak" had been a variant name.

Climate
Mount Jepson is located in an alpine climate zone. Most weather fronts originate in the Pacific Ocean, and travel east toward the Sierra Nevada mountains. As fronts approach, they are forced upward by the peaks (orographic lift), causing them to drop their moisture in the form of rain or snowfall onto the range. Precipitation runoff from this mountain drains northeast to South Fork Big Pine Creek, as well as south into Palisade Creek which is a tributary of the Middle Fork Kings River.

Gallery

See also
 
 Sequoia-Kings Canyon Wilderness
 Thirteener

References

External links
 Weather forecast: Mount Jepson

Mountains of Fresno County, California
Mountains of Inyo County, California
Mountains of Kings Canyon National Park
North American 4000 m summits
Mountains of Northern California
Sierra Nevada (United States)
Mountains of the John Muir Wilderness
Inyo National Forest